The Catalina Solar Project is a 143.2 megawatt (MW) photovoltaic power station located near Bakersfield, Kern County, California, owned by enXco, an EDF Énergies Nouvelles Company.

Construction began in May, 2012 and was fully completed in August, 2013. It use thin-film PV panels bought from Solar Frontier (CIGS type) and First Solar (CdTe type).

Phase 1 had a nameplate capacity of 60 MW and was connected to the grid in December, 2012.

enXco has signed a 25-year Power Purchase Agreement (PPA) with San Diego Gas & Electric (SDG&E) for the production from the station.

That clean electricity could offset roughly 74,000 tons of carbon emissions each year.

Production

See also 

Solar power in California

References 

Solar power stations in California
Photovoltaic power stations in the United States
Buildings and structures in Kern County, California
Tehachapi Mountains